William Plummer (1873–1943) was an African American cabinetmaker and inventor from Smyth County, Virginia.

William Plummer may also refer to:

William Edmunds Plummer (1861–1918), member of the Wisconsin State Assembly
W. H. Plummer (1860–1926), member of the Washington State Senate

See also
William Plumer (disambiguation)